The 2014 LKL Slam Dunk Contest was an event that was a part of the LKL's All-Star Day, that took place in Klaipėda's Švyturys Arena, on March 2.

Results 
The winner was Travis Leslie of Šiauliai. The results of the contest are documented below:

References 

Slam